The 1991 Windsor municipal election was held in the City of Windsor, Ontario, Canada on November 12, 1991, to elect a mayor, ten councillors, utility commissioners and school trustees.

Results

Mayor

Council

Karen Bennett was a civil engineer technologist, and served as chair of the Court of Revisions - Local Improvements in the 1990s.  The 1991 election was her first campaign.  She campaigned again in the 1994 municipal election under the name "Karen Spencer-Gibbs", calling for property tax reform and infrastructural upgrades.
Rick P. Cian holds Bachelor of Commerce and Master of Business Administration degrees from the University of Windsor.  He was thirty years old in 1991, and worked as a pension analyst for Chrysler Canada Ltd.  He called for a reduction in welfare rolls, and argued that city government should be run as a business.
Joseph Theriault was a contract administrator for Tri-Way Machine Ltd., and was active in a Brighton Beach ratepayers organization.  He was thirty-five years old in 1991.

Electors in each ward could vote for two candidates for council.  Percentages refer to the total number of votes.

Source: Windsor Star newspaper, 13 November 1991.

Footnotes

1991 elections in Canada
Municipal elections in Windsor, Ontario
1991 in Ontario